The 1960 Delaware gubernatorial election was held on November 8, 1960.

Incumbent Republican Governor J. Caleb Boggs was term-limited, having served two consecutive terms. Boggs instead ran for the U.S. Senate.

Democratic nominee Elbert N. Carvel defeated Republican nominee John W. Rollins with 51.73% of the vote.

Nominations
Nominations were made by party conventions.

Democratic nomination
The Democratic convention was held on August 25.

Candidate
Elbert N. Carvel, former Governor, nominated by acclamation

Republican nomination
The Republican convention was held on August 31 and September 1.

Candidate
John W. Rollins, former Lieutenant Governor

Withdrew
David P. Buckson, incumbent Lieutenant Governor

General election

Results

References

Bibliography
 
 

1960
Delaware
Gubernatorial
November 1960 events in the United States